Amit Kumar Yadav was an Indian politician. He was elected to the Jharkhand Legislative Assembly from Barkatha in the 2009 election as a member of the Bharatiya Janata Party. In 2019 Yadav contested as an independent candidate from this constituency and won. His father Chitranjan Yadav also served this constituency from 2005 to 2009.

References

People from Hazaribagh
Jharkhand MLAs 2019–2024
Jharkhand MLAs 2009–2014
Members of the Jharkhand Legislative Assembly
Living people
Year of birth missing (living people)
Bharatiya Janata Party politicians from Jharkhand